Cane River Lake is a 35 mi (56 km) oxbow lake formed from a portion of the Red River in Natchitoches Parish, Louisiana, United States. It runs throughout the Natchitoches' historic district to the south and is famous for the numerous plantations, particularly Melrose being located on or near its banks.

The lake was widely publicized between 1966 and 1979 by the nationally known outdoorsman Grits Gresham, host (with Curt Gowdy) of ABC's The American Sportsman and author of numerous books and columns on hunting, fishing, and guns.

The American historian, Henry C. Dethloff, grew up on Cane River and as a youth swam the entire width of the stream underwater.

See also
Cane River National Heritage Area
Cane River Creole National Historical Park
Marathon Rowing Championship

References

External links
 Cane River Lake History
 Cane River Creole National Park

Lakes of Louisiana
Bodies of water of Natchitoches Parish, Louisiana
Oxbow lakes of the United States
Cane River National Heritage Area
Natchitoches, Louisiana
Rowing venues in the United States